Wancho is a Unicode block containing the characters of the script used to write the Wancho language.

History
The following Unicode-related documents record the purpose and process of defining specific characters in the Wancho block:

References 

Unicode blocks
Wancho language